Elista ((common during the Soviet era) or  (most common pronunciation used after 1992 and in Kalmykia itself); , Elst) is the capital city of the Republic of Kalmykia, Russia.

It was known as Stepnoy (Степно́й) from 1944 to 1957.

Geography
The city is located in the area of the Yergeni hills, in the upper part of the Elista valley. The sources of the river are located in the western part of the city. The Elista crosses the urban area from west to east, dividing it into two sections, a larger northern part and a smaller southern one.

History

Elista was founded in 1865 as a small settlement, the name is from Kalmyk els(e)n 'sand(y)'. In November 1920, Elista became the administrative center of Kalmyk Autonomous Oblast. By the early 1930s, Elista was transformed into a small city as the collectivization policies of Joseph Stalin forced many Kalmyks to abandon their traditional pastoral nomadic lifestyle in exchange for a modern, sedentary, and urban lifestyle. In October 1935, Elista was recognized as the capital of the Kalmyk ASSR.
In late 1942, the city was briefly occupied by the German army. Because of alleged collaboration between the ethnic Kalmyks and the Germans, on December 27, 1943, the Kalmyk ASSR was dissolved and its ethnic Kalmyk residents were forcibly exiled to Siberia. Russian people were brought in to repopulate Elista whose name was changed to Stepnoy. It was called Stepnoy until 1957, when the survivors of the deportations were allowed to return from exile.

Some western tourists started to visit Elista from the mid-1990s, and more after it received publicity as the host city of the 1998 Chess Olympiad. The city is safe and has little traffic. On the outskirts of Elista, there are vast grasslands.

Administrative and municipal status
Elista is the capital of the republic. Within the framework of administrative divisions, it is, together with four rural localities, incorporated as the City of Elista—an administrative unit with the status equal to that of the districts. As a municipal division, the City of Elista is incorporated as Elista Urban Okrug.

Features

Since 1991, the town has been characterized by the slow decay of Soviet-built institutions, and the large construction projects instigated by the republic's millionaire president Kirsan Ilyumzhinov.

The town center has a number of renovated public parks focused on the main square, boasting statues to both Lenin and the Buddha. To the east of the town lies the Olympic village of the 1998 XXXIII Chess Olympiad, known locally as "City-Chess". The site has a public swimming pool and a museum of Kalmyk Buddhist art, which is also infrequently used as a conference center.

During his visit in 1998, the 14th Dalai Lama chose a location west of the town center to build the Burkhan Bakshin Altan Sume, a Buddhist temple for city residents. It was opened in December 2005. It is the largest Buddhist temple in Europe.

Transportation
Elista has a small regional airport which is open daily during the week, providing flights to Moscow and various cities in the southern part of the Russian Federation. The airport was closed by the federal aviation authorities sometime in the fall of 2006, but was reopened sometime in 2007. Rail connections are available to Stavropol.

Due to the high cost of air travel, people usually prefer to take the bus between Elista and Moscow. The trip is approximately 18 hours and makes several rest stops along the route. Nowadays there is an airline, Azimuth, that provides air flights to Moscow, Saint Petersburg, Sochi, Crimea and Rostov on Don at affordable cost with direct flights from Elista airport. The price starts at 2500 rubles one way and it saves traveler a lot of time instead of traveling by bus as it was in the past.

Within Elista itself, a network of about a dozen marshrutka (minibus) routes is run by private companies. Minibuses are available around every five minutes. This is the preferred option of most Kalmykians because of the minimal cost (10 rubles).

Climate

Elista has a hot-summer humid continental climate (Köppen climate classification Dfa), although it has sometimes been described as a temperate semi-arid climate (Köppen classification BSk).

Demographics
Population:

Ethnic composition (2010):
 Kalmyks – 69.3%
 Russians – 26.3%
 Kazakhs – 0.6%
 Others – 3.8%

Twin towns – sister cities

Elista is twinned with:

 Aktau, Kazakhstan
 Khoni, Georgia
 Kyzyl, Russia
 Lhasa, China
 Ulaanbaatar, Mongolia
 Ulan-Ude, Russia

Photo gallery

See also
Kalmyk State University
Uralan Elista

References

Notes

Sources
Justin Corfield, The History of Kalmykia: From Ancient Times to Kirsan Ilyumzhinov and Aleksey Orlov, 2015. .

External links

Official website of Elista 
Elista Business Directory 
Information about Elista 

 
1865 establishments in the Russian Empire
Populated places established in 1865